In a Word or 2 is the second and final album released by Monie Love. It was released on 23 March 1993 by Warner Bros. Records and was mostly produced by Marley Marl. Prince cowrote and coproduced the title track and "Born 2 B.R.E.E.D." Monie and producer Aaron "Freedom" Lyles produced the song "I'm a Believer," while producer/remixer Steve "Silk" Hurley was brought in for additional production and remix for the first single "Born to B.R.E.E.D."

In a Word or 2 reached No. 75 on the Billboard Top R&B Albums chart and No. 36 on the Top Heatseekers chart. Two singles also charted: "Born 2 B.R.E.E.D." reached No. 89 on the Billboard Hot 100, while "Full Term Love" peaked at No. 96 on the Hot 100. On the Hot R&B Singles chart, both peaked at No. 7.

Critical reception
AllMusic wrote that "Love's musical voice and singsong delivery are still in effect, but her raps are decidedly more aggressive, lacking the playful air of her first record." The Encyclopedia of Popular Music called the album "another challenging and articulate set ... informed by Love's recent experience of motherhood." The Los Angeles Times wrote: "A combination of substance and sass, Monie Love’s second album is tougher and funkier than the pop-hop featured on 1990’s Down to Earth.” Trouser Press opined that "only 'There’s a Better Way,' a cautionary story about HIV, hits the right mix of music and mind."

Track listing
"Wheel of Fortune"- 3:55
"Greasy"- 4:08
"Sex U All"- 5:03
"Mo' Monie"- 4:14
"I'm a Believer"- 3:43
"Let a Woman B a Woman"- 4:15
"Full Term Love"- 4:44
"Born 2 B.R.E.E.D."- 4:06
"In a Word or 2"- 3:36
"There's a Better Way"- 3:58
"4 da Children"- 4:26
"Born 2 B.R.E.E.D." (Hip-Hop Mix)- 4:12

References

1993 albums
Monie Love albums
Warner Records albums
Albums produced by Marley Marl
Albums produced by Prince (musician)
Chrysalis Records albums